Andrew Peter David Welsh (born 24 January 1983) is a football coach and former player who is the manager of Bury AFC.

Born in England, Welsh played for the Scotland under-19 side.

Playing career

Stockport County
The left-footed Welsh wrote to the club asking for a trial run and made his professional debut for Stockport County in October 2001, going on to make 75 league appearances in his four-year stint at the club. His final match was a 3–0 loss to Sheffield Wednesday in League One. He also made six appearances on loan at Macclesfield Town in 2002.

Sunderland
After impressing in a three-day trial with Sunderland in November 2004, Welsh signed with the club for £15,000, and could have included a compensation for amount of time on the field stipulation to £35,000. Upon signing for Sunderland he was assigned the vacant number 11 shirt, and made his club debut on 1 January 2005 in a 3–2 defeat to Preston North End, replacing Marcus Stewart in the 68th minute. He scored two goals in eight appearances during the 2004–05 season for Sunderland.

Welsh made his first start for Sunderland a week later on 8 January 2005, scoring a free kick in a 2–1 victory against Crystal Palace. Welsh went on to make eight appearances that season, scoring again, against QPR at Loftus Road on 2 April.

After Sunderland's promotion to the Premier League, Welsh retained the number 11 shirt, starting the season in place of injured defender George McCartney. However, Welsh was controversially sent off in only the second game of the season against Liverpool at Anfield on 20 August 2005, although the decision was later overturned on appeal.

Welsh found himself out of the Sunderland team after Christmas, and many thought he had played his last game for the club after he was loaned to Championship club Leicester on 1 March 2006. Welsh went on to make ten appearances for Leicester, scoring one goal, helping to stave off relegation for the Foxes.

Four days after playing his last game for Leicester, Welsh was back at Sunderland, playing in the club's last two games, against Fulham and Aston Villa, under new caretaker manager Kevin Ball. Following the transfer of popular midfielder Julio Arca to Middlesbrough in the summer, Welsh was expected to start the season as first choice winger, however injury hit early on in pre-season.

Welsh picked up an injury during a pre-season win against League of Ireland club, Shelbourne, prompting Quinn and new manager Roy Keane to sign Swedish winger Tobias Hysen and Celtic midfielder Ross Wallace to fill the left-midfield role. Welsh subsequently re-joined Leicester on loan when he regained fitness, although he managed only four league starts for them, and returned to Sunderland in the New Year. Coincidentally, Sunderland's next game was against Leicester at the Walkers Stadium, where Welsh was named as an unused substitute.

Toronto
After failing to break back into Sunderland's first team, it was announced in March 2007, that Welsh would be heading to Canada for a medical before signing a contract with Major League Soccer (MLS) club, Toronto FC, after the clubs agreed a deal to end his contract at Sunderland.

On 16 May 2007, Welsh scored his first goal for Toronto in a rain soaked 1–0 home win over defending MLS champions, Houston Dynamo. Fans subsequently voted him "Man of the Match" on the club's official website. However, after the first few games Toronto struggled to find points hard to come by, Welsh was in and out of the team and soon decided to return to England.

Blackpool
On 30 August 2007, it was reported that Welsh would be leaving Toronto for Blackpool, 
 whom he signed for the following day. During the 2007–08 season he made 21 appearances in the Championship, mostly as a substitute. On 7 May 2008 he was released by Blackpool.

Yeovil Town
In August 2008 Welsh went on trial at Football League One club Yeovil Town. On 3 September, Yeovil manager Russell Slade confirmed that the club had a verbal agreement to sign Welsh with him due to have a medical at the club the following day. Welsh signed a contract with the club until the end of the 2008–09 season. Welsh played 38 games for Yeovil in his first season, he became a bit of a fans favourite when the team went on a 4-game winning streak the team scoring 4 goals direct from his set pieces. He ended the season with Yeovil's most assists on 7 and most crosses on 80, in his 38 appearances.

At the end of the 2008–09 season, Welsh signed a new two-year deal keeping him at the club until the summer of 2011. In the 2009–10 season Welsh started well and was the divisional top goal maker with 7 assists. However, formation changes saw him slip out of the side a bit, making most of his appearances from the subs bench. However, he was Yeovil's leading creator for the second consecutive season with 10 assists. He also scored his first two goals for the club, in the 2 – 0 win over Brentford and the 4 – 1 win over Wycombe.

Welsh scored in his second game of the season 2010–11 against local rivals Exeter City FC a stunning low volley and then a header against Tranmere Rovers FC two weeks later. Welsh again has been one of Yeovil Town FC outstanding performers this season leading the way in assists again and also scoring some important goals. Welsh recently secured Yeovil's league one status for another season with an 85th-minute equaliser at home to Oldham Athletic the day after his first child was born.

At the end of the 2010–11 season, he and six other Yeovil players were told they would be re-signed.

Carlisle United
On 1 June 2011, Welsh became Greg Abbott's first signing of the summer when he joined Carlisle United on a two-year deal. It was revealed on 27 May 2013 that Welsh was not going to be offered a new contract and would no longer be a Carlisle United player come the end of the 2012/13 season.

Scunthorpe United

On 24 June 2013, Andy Welsh become Scunthorpe United's 5th signing of the summer where he has signed a one-year deal for the league two club with an option of a further year.

Unfortunately Welsh after playing every game up until start of October ended up having knee surgery which ruled him out until February 2014.

Having been part of the squad that won league two that season Welsh' s injury hampered his season and he decided at the end of the season to pursue the remainder of his degree in psychology and coaching.

Non-League

On 12 September 2014, Andy Welsh signed for FC United of Manchester. In December 2014, Welsh made the move to Farsley AFC, closer to his home in Bradford.

Managerial career
In September 2017, Andy Welsh became player/head coach at Ossett Albion.A team struggling 2nd bottom in the league on 7 points at Christmas Welsh led them on an unbeaten run finishing safely in the league.

He then took over at the newly merged club Ossett United finishing 4th in the League with the best defensive record in the league the season was a success winning the cup against Guiseley a team 2 divisions higher and making the playoffs.

On 29 July 2020, Welsh was selected from 750 applicants to become the first manager of Bury AFC. After the first season was ended prematurely due to the COVID-19 pandemic,

Bury were crowned champions of the NWCFL Division One North in the club's second season.
Welsh Led Bury to the title finishing 11 points clear winning 27 out of 36 games boasting both the highest goal scoring and best defensive record in the division.

Career statistics

Managerial statistics
 2 cup matches drawn 1 won on penalties and 1 lost. Score at 90 minutes counted as drawn game

References

External links
Welsh's profile at Yeovil Town F.C.

1983 births
Living people
Footballers from Manchester
Scottish footballers
Association football wingers
Stockport County F.C. players
Macclesfield Town F.C. players
Sunderland A.F.C. players
Leicester City F.C. players
Toronto FC players
Blackpool F.C. players
Yeovil Town F.C. players
Carlisle United F.C. players
Scunthorpe United F.C. players
Premier League players
English Football League players
Major League Soccer players
Expatriate soccer players in Canada
F.C. United of Manchester players
English footballers
English people of Scottish descent
Farsley Celtic A.F.C. players
Ossett Albion A.F.C. players
Ossett Albion A.F.C. managers
Ossett United F.C. managers
Scotland youth international footballers
English expatriate sportspeople in Canada
English expatriate footballers
Scottish expatriate sportspeople in Canada
Scottish expatriate footballers
English football managers
Bury A.F.C. managers